Kalateh-ye Mesgarha (also Romanized as Kalāteh-ye Mesgarhā and Kalāteh-ye Mesgarā) is a village in Howmeh Rural District, in the Central District of Gonabad County, Razavi Khorasan Province, Iran. At the 2006 census, its population was 17, in 4 families.

References 

Populated places in Gonabad County